Chartwell Shopping Centre is a shopping centre located on a  site in the suburb of Chartwell,  north of Hamilton, New Zealand. The shopping centre is informally referred to as "Chartwell Square" by many Hamilton residents, as this was its name before The Westfield Group took over ownership.

History and development
The centre was built in 1974, and underwent a major redevelopment in 1992.

Between 2005 and 2007 Westfield Chartwell underwent a NZ$40 million upgrade. This saw the opening of a Skycity Cinema complex, a new food court with 450 seats, multi-storey car parking for 270 vehicles, and many new stores in place. The grand opening of the refurbished Westfield was scheduled for Thursday, 7 December 2006, but the opening of the Skycity Cinema was delayed until Thursday, 17 May 2007.

In January 2010 Westfield Chartwell committed NZ$33million towards another upgrade, which was completed in October of the same year. This expansion included a new two level Farmers department store and the opening of several new stores.

In November 2015, Stride Property announced they would be purchasing the Chartwell Shopping Centre from Scentre Group. It had agreed to pay $445 million for the Westfield Queensgate shopping centre in Lower Hutt and the Westfield Chartwell shopping centre in Hamilton. The rebrand took effect in August 2016.

References

External links
 Chartwell Shopping Centrel Website

Shopping centres in New Zealand
Shopping malls established in 1974
1970s architecture in New Zealand